The Women's 4 × 5 kilometre relay cross-country skiing event was part of the cross-country skiing programme at the 1988 Winter Olympics, in Calgary, Canada. It was the ninth appearance of the women's relay event. The competition was held on 21 February 1988, at the Canmore Nordic Centre.

Results

References

Women's cross-country skiing at the 1988 Winter Olympics
Women's 4 × 5 kilometre relay cross-country skiing at the Winter Olympics
Oly
Cross